Andreas Antonius Maria "Dries" van Agt (born 2 February 1931) is a Dutch politician and diplomat of the defunct Catholic People's Party (KVP) and later the Christian Democratic Appeal (CDA) party and jurist who served as Prime Minister of the Netherlands from 19 December 1977 until 4 November 1982.

Van Agt studied law at the Radboud University Nijmegen, obtaining a Master of Laws degree and worked as a criminal defense lawyer in Eindhoven from September 1955 until December 1957 and as a civil servant at the Ministries of Agriculture and Fisheries and Justice from December 1957 until January 1968. Van Agt worked as a professor of Criminal law and Criminal procedure at his alma mater from January 1968 until July 1971 and served as a judge at the district court of Arnhem from April 1970 until May 1971. After the election of 1971 Van Agt was appointed as Minister of Justice in the Cabinet Biesheuvel I and taking office on 6 July 1971. Van Agt was elected as a Member of the House of Representatives after the election of 1972 serving from on 23 January 1973 until 22 April 1973. Following the cabinet formation of 1973 Van Agt continued as Minister of Justice in the Cabinet Den Uyl and also became Deputy Prime Minister taking office on 11 May 1973. On 10 December 1976 Van Agt was selected as the first Leader and Lijsttrekker (top candidate) of the newly formed Christian Democratic Appeal for the election of 1977. After the election Van Agt returned as a Member of the House of Representatives and became the Parliamentary leader taking office on 8 June 1977 and subsequently resigned from the cabinet on 8 September 1977. Following a successful cabinet formation with Liberal Leader Hans Wiegel Van Agt formed the Cabinet Van Agt I and became Prime Minister of the Netherlands taking office 19 December 1977.

For the election of 1981 Van Agt again served as Lijsttrekker and following a cabinet formation with his predecessor as Prime Minister Labour Leader Joop den Uyl formed the Cabinet Van Agt II and continued as Prime Minister for a second term. The cabinet fell just seven months into its term and was replaced with the caretaker Cabinet Van Agt III with Van Agt continuing as Prime Minister and also serving as Minister of Foreign Affairs taking office on 29 May 1982. For the election of 1982 Van Agt once again served as Lijsttrekker but shortly thereafter unexpectedly announced he was stepping down as Leader and that he wouldn't serve another term as Prime Minister. Van Agt left office following the installation of the Cabinet Lubbers I on 4 November 1982 but continued to serve in the House of Representatives as a backbencher.

Van Agt continued to be active in politics and in May 1983 was nominated as the next Queen's Commissioner of North Brabant taking office on 1 June 1983. In December 1986 Van Agt was appointed as Ambassador of the European Union to Japan serving from 1 January 1987 until 1 January 1990 when he named as Ambassador of the European Union to the United States serving until 1 April 1995. Van Agt retired from active politics at 64 and became active in the public sector as a non-profit director and served on several state commissions and councils on behalf of the government, he also served as a distinguished visiting professor of International relations, Peace and conflict studies and Governmental studies at the United Nations University, Kwansei Gakuin University, Kyoto University and Ritsumeikan University from February 1996 until May 2004. Following his retirement Van Agt continued to be active public sector and worked as an advocate, lobbyist and activist for the Anti-war movement, Human Rights and the Two-State solution in the Israeli–Palestinian conflict.

Van Agt was known for his abilities as a skillful Debater and negotiator. During his premiership, his cabinets were responsible for several major public sector and civil service reforms and further reducing the deficit following the recession in the 1980s. Van Agt continued to comment on political affairs as a statesman until he suffered a major stroke in May 2019 which forced him to undergo rehabilitation. He holds the distinction as the oldest living and earliest serving former Prime Minister following the death of Piet de Jong in July 2016.

Early life
Andreas Antonius Maria van Agt was born in Geldrop in the Netherlands Province of North Brabant in a Roman Catholic family. After receiving his diploma Gymnasium-A at the Augustinianum he studied at the Catholic University of Nijmegen, where he received his Doctorate in Law in 1955. After graduating, he practiced law in Eindhoven until 1957, after which he worked in the office of legal and business affairs of the Ministry of Agriculture and Fisheries until 1962. From 1962 to 1968, he worked for the Ministry of Justice.

Politics

Minister and Deputy Prime Minister

Van Agt entered politics as a member of the Catholic People's Party, which merged with the other two major Christian Democratic parties in 1980 to form the Christian Democratic Appeal (CDA). From 1968 to 1971, Van Agt was Professor of Criminal Law at the Catholic University of Nijmegen. From 1971 to 1973, he was Minister of Justice in the government of Barend Biesheuvel. He caused outrage when he tried to pardon the last three Nazi war criminals still in Dutch prisons in 1972. From 1973 to 1977 he was Deputy Prime Minister and Minister of Justice in the government of Joop den Uyl.

Leader of the Christian Democratic Appeal
In 1976, Van Agt was elected the first Leader of the Christian Democratic Appeal, then still a federation of the three religious parties Christian Historical Union, Catholic People's Party and Anti-Revolutionary Party, which first ran in 1977 with a united list (the merger followed in 1980). With Van Agt as top candidate, the Christian Democratic Appeal reversed in 1977 years of decline to return to power.

Prime Minister in the Cabinet Van Agt I
In the parliamentary elections of May 1977 the Labour Party obtained their largest number of seats, so a second Den Uyl coalition looked likely. However, the tension between the Catholic People's Party and the Labour Party in the last reign, combined with the fact that a coalition between Christian Democratic Appeal and the People's Party for Freedom and Democracy was possible, the talks failed after a period of seven months. Eventually Van Agt negotiated a deal with Hans Wiegel, leader of the People's Party for Freedom and Democracy. From 19 December 1977 to 11 September 1981 Van Agt was Prime Minister of the Netherlands and Minister of General Affairs in the Cabinet Van Agt I.

Prime Minister in the Cabinet Van Agt II
In 1981, the Christian Democratic Appeal, People's Party for Freedom and Democracy and Labour Party lost parliamentary seats, so a continuation of a Christian Democratic Appeal-People's Party for Freedom and Democracy coalition was not possible. Van Agt, leader of the Christian Democratic Appeal, was forced to go in coalition with the Labour Party. Also Democrats 66 (which, under Jan Terlouw gained a significant number of seats) participated in the coalition talks, after 3 months of difficult negotiations that resulted in the Cabinet Van Agt II (11 September 1981 – 29 May 1982). In this composition Van Agt worked with Joop den Uyl again as Den Uyl was made Deputy Prime Minister and "super minister" of Social Affairs and Employment. The characterological and political differences led to several divisions, and in May 1982 the government fell.

The personal strife between Van Agt and Den Uyl were so deteriorated that when Den Uyl died from a brain tumor in 1987, Van Agt was not invited to the memorial by the family. Den Uyl's wife Liesbeth argued that Van Agt had prevented the second Den Uyl coalition from forming in 1977.

Prime Minister in the Cabinet Van Agt III
The caretaker government went through as a minority cabinet, with only ministers from the parties Christian Democratic Appeal and Democrats 66, in the Cabinet Van Agt III. For replacing the six Labour Party ministers, five new Christian Democratic Appeal and Democrats 66 ministers were in place, while van Agt in the cabinet, as well as being Prime Minister was also Minister of Foreign Affairs.

New parliamentary elections were organized for September 1982. Although Van Agt, by this point was worn out, he was persuaded again to be Leader of the Christian Democratic Appeal but shortly after the election he withdrew as a candidate for prime minister and was succeeded by Ruud Lubbers.

After politics

Diplomat
Dries van Agt served as Ambassador of the European Community to Japan from 1987 to 1990 and to the United States from 1990 to 1995. From 1995 to 1996, he was a Visiting Professor of International Relations at the University of Kyoto.

Professor
He is currently Prime Counsellor for the International Forum for Justice and Peace, a foundation under Dutch law, registered at the Chamber of Commerce in Amsterdam. Chaired by retired international businessman Ben Smoes, they are currently focused on justice and peace in regard to the Israel/Palestine conflict

Activist
Van Agt lectured in May 2006 in Cairo at the invitation of the Egyptian electronic magazine Arab-West Report about great changes in the cultural climate of north-western Europe in the past decades, becoming more hostile to religion, including Islam. Muslims, he argued, need to understand those changes to be able to respond better to European criticism on Islam and the Muslim world.

Van Agt has also spoken against the Council of State in Egypt for continuous delay in granting the Center for Arab-West Understanding (CAWU) the NGO status. He met with prominent figures in Egypt to persuade them to do so. The Egyptian Council of State, after van Agt's visit to Cairo in 2006, ruled on 18 February 2007 that the center should be recognized as an NGO under Egyptian law, ending its three-year struggle to obtain this status. Egypt is known for its reluctance in granting NGO status to discourage political participation. Cornelis Hulsman, a Dutch sociologist, the editor-in-chief of Arab-West Report, and the head of CAWU, stated that van Agt's effort significantly impacted the realization of their goals, which usually requires a lengthy amount of time and scrutiny in its political purposes.

For some years he has taken an outspoken stance regarding the Middle East, resulting in a fierce criticism of the policies undertaken by the government of Israel with regard to the Palestinians. When in office, van Agt was a staunch supporter of Israel, but after he stepped down in 1982 he changed his mind. According to his own words an important turning point was a visit at the late nineties at Bethlehem University on the Israeli-occupied West Bank. He has accused Israel of "state terrorism" and turning the Palestinian Authority territories into "bantustans". In 2012, Van Agt said that Jews should have a state in Germany instead of Israel. In September 2016, in reference to the visit of Prime Minister of Israel Benjamin Netanyahu to the Netherlands, van Agt argued that the ongoing Israeli occupation of the Palestinian territories and the building of settlements there constituted a war crime under the Rome Statute and suggested that Netanyahu should have been sent to the International Criminal Court.

Personal life
Van Agt is known for his use of archaic language and complicated phrasing, as well as for his love for cycling. He married Eugenie Krekelberg in 1958, and they have three children and seven grandchildren. In 2012, he joined the Advisory Board of the International Museum for Family History. Van Agt lives in Heilig Landstichting, near Nijmegen

Decorations

Honours

Awards

Honorary degrees

References

External links
Official

  Mr. A.A.M. (Dries) van Agt Parlement & Politiek
  Kabinet-Van Agt I Rijksoverheid
  Kabinet-Van Agt II Rijksoverheid
  Kabinet-Van Agt III Rijksoverheid

 
 

 
 

 
 

Living people
Academic staff of United Nations University
Ambassadors of the European Union to Japan
Ambassadors of the European Union to the United States
Anti–Iraq War activists
Catholic People's Party politicians
Christian Democratic Appeal politicians
Criminal defense lawyers
Democracy activists
Deputy Prime Ministers of the Netherlands
Dutch anti-war activists
Dutch critics
Dutch expatriates in Japan
Dutch expatriates in the United States
Dutch humanitarians
Dutch human rights activists
Dutch language activists
Dutch legal scholars
Dutch legal writers
Dutch nonprofit directors
Dutch officials of the European Union
Dutch political activists
Dutch political writers
Dutch Roman Catholics
Governmental studies academics
King's and Queen's Commissioners of North Brabant
Knights Grand Cross of the Order of Orange-Nassau
Academic staff of Kwansei Gakuin University
Academic staff of Kyoto University
Leaders of the Christian Democratic Appeal
International criminal law scholars
Dutch international relations scholars
Israeli–Palestinian peace process
Members of the House of Representatives (Netherlands)
Ministers of Foreign Affairs of the Netherlands
Ministers of Justice of the Netherlands
People from Eindhoven
People from Geldrop
People from Groesbeek
People from Berg en Dal (municipality)
People from Nijmegen
Peace and conflict scholars
Presidents of the European Council
Prime Ministers of the Netherlands
Radboud University Nijmegen alumni
Academic staff of Radboud University Nijmegen
Recipients of the Order of the House of Orange
Academic staff of Ritsumeikan University
Scholars of criminal law
Writers about activism and social change
Writers on the Middle East
20th-century Dutch civil servants
20th-century Dutch diplomats
20th-century Dutch educators
20th-century Dutch judges
20th-century Dutch male writers
20th-century Dutch politicians
20th-century Dutch scientists
21st-century Dutch male writers
1931 births